The Richmond Spiders women's basketball team represents the University of Richmond in Richmond, Virginia and currently competes in the Atlantic 10 Conference. The team plays its home games at the Robins Center.

History
Richmond began play in 1919. They were a member of the ECAC South from 1983 to 1985. They joined the Colonial Athletic Association in 1985. During their time in the CAA, they won two tournament titles, beating James Madison 47–46 in 1990 and East Carolina 88–70, while finishing as runner up in 1984 (losing 54–39 to East Carolina) and 1989 (losing 55–45 to James Madison). They also won the regular season title in 1984 and 1990. They joined the Atlantic-10 Conference in 2001. The Spiders have made the NCAA Tournament three times (1990, 1991, 2005) and the Women's National Invitation Tournament ten times (1989, 2003, 2004, 2009, 2010, 2011, 2012, 2013, 2015, 2023). As of the end of the 2021–22 season, the Spiders have an all-time record of 978–732–7.

NCAA tournament results

References

External links